Cat Burns is a British singer-songwriter. She rose to prominence with her 2020 single "Go", which gained popularity in 2022 via TikTok and ultimately peaked at number two on the UK Singles Chart. Sony Music has described Burns' sound as a mixture of gospel and pop influences combined with guitar-led indie music. Burns is a three-time Brit Award nominee.

Career 
Burns recorded her debut EP Adolescent at the age of sixteen while she was still studying at The BRITs School. She explained that she had befriended a fellow student whose parents had built him a recording studio in their garden shed and that, together, they put together the songs which would form the basis of Adolescent, which she self-released on 1 October 2016. Following this, Burns attempted to secure a record deal but struggled, feeling as though the music industry did not know what to do with an artist like her.

On 15 May 2019, Naïve, Burns second EP, was released.

Burns gained widespread attention in 2020 during the COVID-19 lockdown when she began posting covers and original songs on TikTok.  "Go" began to go viral and she ended up securing a record deal with Since 93, a subsidiary of RCA Records. Originally released in 2020, "Go" ultimately reached number two on the UK Singles Chart, being held off the top spot by Harry Styles' "As It Was".
In 2022, Burns supported Years & Years frontman Olly Alexander on the UK leg of his Night Call Tour and Ed Sheeran on selected dates of his Mathematics Tour. Burns performed "Go" and "People Pleaser" on Jools' Annual Hootenanny 2022, having previously made her debut on Later... with Jools Holland in May.

On 9 March 2023, Burns released the single "Home for My Heart", a collaboration with rapper ArrDee. Actor and writer Kwame Kwei-Armah is credited as a lyricist on the single. "Home for my Heart" debuted at number 35 on the UK singles chart on 17 March 2023.

Artistry 
In a 2019 interview with Gal-dem, Burns cited Kirk Franklin, Anne-Marie, Destiny's Child and Marvin Sapp as musical influences. She has also mentioned Kim Burrell, Donnie McClurkin, Tracy Chapman, India Arie, Tori Kelly, Lily Allen, Jimi Hendrix, Michael Jackson and Stevie Wonder as notable influences from her childhood. Discussing her sound, Burns stated "I would say it's just pop with a cooler edge to it because obviously I'm influenced by so many different things. At first, I wanted it to be...because I loved Ed Sheeran so much, I wanted it to be singer-songwriter-y and guitar-y and then as I found my own sound and what I wanted to make it was mainly just pop but I sing in my accent so it has that Britishness to it but I am just talking about relatable things and things that have happened to me or other people".

Personal life 
Cat Burns is a London-born artist. Both her parents migrated from Liberia during the civil war. Burns is queer. In an interview with Gay Times, she explained that she initially struggled to reconcile her sexuality with her ethnicity, stating “If you're a Black woman, I want you to feel heard and seen. We are vulnerable people who are capable of having lots of emotions. And, being a Black queer woman adds a layer to that.” Burns chronicled her experience with coming out to her family in her song "Free".

Burns has ADHD and noted in an interview that she had often found this helpful in her creative process, explaining "Both the chords and words come at the same time, but the concept comes first and I’ve found that that system has always worked for me! Helps the process of writing the song become a lot quicker which is great for my ADHD brain!".

Discography

Extended plays

Singles

Tours

Supporting
Night Call Tour (2022) supporting Years & Years
+–=÷× Tour (2022) supporting Ed Sheeran
Gloria Tour (2023) supporting Sam Smith

Awards and nominations

Notes

References

External links
 
 

Living people
Singers from London
21st-century Black British women singers
21st-century English women singers
21st-century English singers
British contemporary R&B singers
English women pop singers
RCA Records artists
English LGBT singers
LGBT Black British people
2000 births